Borislav "Reba" Ćorković (9 January 1933 – 26 January 2006) was a Serbian professional basketball player and coach.

Playing career
During the 1950s, Ćorković played basketball for Dinamo Pančevo of the Yugoslav League.

Coaching career
In 1958, Ćorković began with coaching career with Železničar Belgrade. From 1960 to 1965, he coached young teams, mostly women, in OKK Belgrade. In 1965, he became a head coach for Partizan women's team, also coached the junior men's team also. In 1974, he joined Partizan men's team. He led Partizan as a head coach for five seasons (1974–75, 1975–76, 1980–81, 1981–82, 1989–90) in three stints. He won two national championships with them. In the late 1990s and during the 2000s, he worked as an advisor for Partizan's youth selections.

As a head coach for the Yugoslavia women's national team, he won the gold medal at the 1977 Balkan Games in Ankara, Turkey, and the bronze medal at the 1978 Games in Thessaloniki. Also, he won the silver medal at the 1978 European Championship for Women in Poznań with 7–2 record. He loses to the Soviet Union and Poland).

Career achievements
As head coach:
 Slobodan Piva Ivković Award for Lifetime Achievement (2007)
 Yugoslav League champion: 2 (with Partizan: 1975–76, 1980–81)

also

 FIBA European Champions Cup – top 6 (with Partizan: 1981–82)
 FIBA European Cup Winners' Cup – quarterfinalist (with Partizan: 1989–90)
 FIBA Korać Cup – semifinalist (with Partizan: 1974–75)

References

1933 births
2006 deaths
Basketball players from Belgrade
KK Partizan coaches
KK Železničar Beograd coaches
KK Dinamo Pančevo players
KK Dinamo Pančevo coaches
Serbian expatriate basketball people in Kuwait
Serbian men's basketball coaches
Serbs of Croatia
Yugoslav basketball coaches
Yugoslav men's basketball players
ŽKK Partizan coaches